The Usambara dwarf gecko (Lygodactylus gravis) is a species of gecko endemic to the Usambara Mountains in Tanzania.

References

Lygodactylus
Reptiles described in 1965
Endemic fauna of Tanzania
Reptiles of Tanzania